The Plymouth Antiquarian Society is a historical organization in Plymouth, Massachusetts. The Society, founded in 1919, owns and maintains the Harlow Old Fort House, the Spooner House, the Hedge House, and an ancient Native American site, Sacrifice Rock.

See also
List of Antiquarian Societies

External links
 Plymouth Antiquarian Society

Plymouth, Massachusetts
Historical societies in Massachusetts
History of Plymouth County, Massachusetts
1919 establishments in Massachusetts